Meilysa Trias Puspita Sari (born 11 May 2004) is an Indonesian badminton player. At the 2022 Santander World Junior Championships, she won a silver in the girls' doubles and a bronze medal in the mixed team event.

Career 
In May 2022, Puspita Sari and her partner Rachel Allessya Rose won their first senior title at the Slovenian International.

2023 
In January, Puspita Sari and Rose competed at the home tournament, Indonesia Masters, but had to lose in the first round from American pair Francesca Corbett and Allison Lee. In the next tournament, they lost in the second round of the Thailand Masters from Chinese pair Li Wenmei and Liu Xuanxuan.

Achievements

World Junior Championships 
Girls' doubles

BWF International Challenge/Series (1 title) 
Women's doubles

  BWF International Challenge tournament
  BWF International Series tournament
  BWF Future Series tournament

BWF Junior International (3 titles) 
Girls' doubles

  BWF Junior International Grand Prix tournament
  BWF Junior International Challenge tournament
  BWF Junior International Series tournament
  BWF Junior Future Series tournament

Performance timeline

National team 
 Junior level

Individual competitions

Junior level 
 Girls' doubles

Senior level 
 Women's doubles

References

External links 
 

2004 births
Living people
People from Banyumas Regency
Sportspeople from Central Java
Indonesian female badminton players
21st-century Indonesian women